Juan Amat Fontanals (10 July 1946 – 12 May 2022) was a Spanish field hockey player. He won the silver medal with the Men's National Team at the 1980 Summer Olympics in Moscow. There he was topscorer of the tournament with sixteen goals, including fourteen penalty corners.

Amat competed in four Olympics for Spain, starting in 1968. A player of Egara he was the brother of Francisco Amat, Jaime Amat, and Pedro Amat.

References

External links
 

1946 births
2022 deaths
Field hockey players from Catalonia
Field hockey players at the 1968 Summer Olympics
Field hockey players at the 1972 Summer Olympics
Field hockey players at the 1976 Summer Olympics
Field hockey players at the 1980 Summer Olympics
Olympic field hockey players of Spain
Spanish male field hockey players
Olympic medalists in field hockey
Medalists at the 1980 Summer Olympics
Olympic silver medalists for Spain
Sportspeople from Terrassa